San Luis is a town and municipality in the Santiago de Cuba Province of Cuba.

History
The city was founded in 1827 on the location of a ranch. Arrival of the railroad accelerated its development. San Luis achieved municipality status on 19 August 1898.

Demographics
In 2004, the municipality of San Luis had a population of 88,496.

The municipality is divided into the barrios of Dos Caminos, La Luz, Majaguabo, Monte Dos Leguas, Norte and Sur.

Economy
It is a railroad junction
Agriculture: processing and trading of sugarcane, coffee, fruit,  coffee roasting
Stock raising
Mining: manganese deposits
Industry: sugar mills Rafael Reyes (NNE) and Paquito Rosales (NE) are located nearby

Personalities
Antonio Maceo y Grajales - Liberation Army General (The Bronze Titan)
Ibrahim Ferrer - Son Singer
Félix B. Caignet - Writer - El derecho de nacer
Barbara Moya Montoya -Derecho de Autor- Compositora - Canciones
 Augusto Rivero Más - Architect
Pedro Meurice Estíu - Archbishop, Santiago de Cuba
Luis Garzón Masabó - Artist
Cándido Fabré - Songwriter and Singer
Justo Salas Arzuaga - First Afro-Cuban Mayor of City of Santiago de Cuba 1940-1945/First Afro-Cuban Governor of Oriente, Cuba 1956)
Europa Casadevall Sola (la mujer mas bella del mundo) hija de Pedro Casadevall y Maria Sola

See also

List of cities in Cuba
Municipalities of Cuba

References

External links

Cities in Cuba
Populated places in Santiago de Cuba Province
Populated places established in 1827
1827 establishments in the Spanish Empire